Velocity Trap is a 1999 television film directed by Phillip J. Roth and starring Olivier Gruner, Alicia Coppola, and Ken Olandt.

Plot
The main character, Ray Stokes (Olivier Gruner) is a down-on-his luck police officer on a distant, corruptly-ruled mining colony. He has already lost his wife Dana (Anna Karin) to his corrupt boss, John Dawson (Craig Wasson), not from any failure in romantic rivalry, but as part of a deal to pay off their dead daughter's medical bills: making her Dawson's "Contract Wife".

Samuel Nelson (Harry Wowchuk), an Enforcement Division chief of security, is sent to clean up the colony's local Enforcement Division, but is killed in the course of his investigation. Stokes is framed for the murder of another ED officer, also killed by Nelson's assassin. However, Dawson is implicated in Nelson's death and wants to avoid any inquiry. He sends Stokes on a six-month trip to Earth, protecting a cargo of cash. Meanwhile, the crew of The Endeavour has planned to intercept the money ship while the crew are in hibernation. The interception occurs, Stokes and Beth Sheffield (Alicia Coppola), the attractive female navigator, are the only survivors of the ensuing gun battles; they steal the money and buy the mining colony. Dawson is arrested for his part in Nelson's death.

External links
 
 

1999 films
1990s science fiction films
American space adventure films
American science fiction television films
1990s English-language films
Films directed by Phillip J. Roth
1990s American films